Zykov Glacier is a valley glacier in northern Victoria Land, Antarctica, east of Saddle Peak and Mount Kostka in the Anare Mountains. It is about 25 miles (40 km) long, and flows northwest, reaching the Pennell Coast between Cape Williams and Cooper Bluffs. Photographed by the Soviet Antarctic Expedition from the survey ship Ob in 1958, it was named by them for student navigator Ye. Zykov, who died in Antarctica, February 3, 1957.

The underlying rock includes micaceous phyllite and micaceous schist; it was estimated by radioisotope dating (potassium–argon) in 1964 to be 410 or 420 million years old. A separate study of metamorphic rocks recovered from near the glacier (1959–62) found evidence of thermal crystallisation.

See also
 List of glaciers in the Antarctic
 Zykov Island, also named for Ye. Zykov

References

Further reading
Ravich, M. G.; Krylov, A. J. "Absolute ages of rocks from East Antarctica". In: Antarctic Geology (Adie, R. J., ed.), pp. 579–89 (North Holland Publishing; 1964)

Glaciers of Pennell Coast